Buscando a María (English title: Searching For María) is a 2015 Chilean telenovela produced and which will be broadcast by Chilevisión. The story is created by Víctor Carrasco, Carlos Galofré, Ivan Salas y Sandra Arriagada. Directed by Roberto Morales.

Tomás Arriagada, Isidora Urrejola and Ricardo Fernández are main protagonist. With Cristián Carvajal, Daniela Palavecino and Lorena Capetillo will stars as the antagonists.

The telenovela production began July 14, 2014. It premiered on December 9, 2015. The telenovela finished on March 11, 2016.

It aired in Africa on Eva Channel on DSTV in English (141) and Portuguese (508) under the title Searching For Maria.
It began to re-air on Eva+ (English142) and Eva+ (Portuguese 509) from November 1, 2016 and received much praise on Eva's Facebook page as many voted it as their favourite telenovela on Eva becoming a fan-favourite.

History 
The story follows the life of Maria Barraza (Isidora Urrejola), a good woman who suffers the aggression of her husband Evaristo (Cristián Carvajal). The plot starts when Evaristo throws his son into the sea.

His son is the kind  Benjamin "Chiripa" Maulen (Tomas Arriagada); everyone thinks he's dead, but it is not. He is alive and decides to go to Santiago to find his mother.

Cast 

Isidora Urrejola as María Barraza Cifuentes
Ricardo Fernández as Pedro Montecinos Briones
Tomás Arriagada as Benjamín "The Chiripa" Maulén Barraza
Cristián Carvajal as Evaristo Maulén - Main Antagonist
Daniela Palavecino as Bernandita Prieto - Antagonist
Carlos Díaz as Sergio Montecinos Briones
Lorena Capetillo as Paola Galdames - Former Antagonist
Schlomit Baytelman as Marta Briones
Malucha Pinto as Raquel Cifuentes
Nicolás Brown as Marcelo Tapia Mardones - R.I.P
Alberto Castillo as Roberto González
Loreto Araya as Irma Flores
Eliana Palermo as Flora Mardones
Claudio Castellón as Rubén Morales
Catalina Martín as Juana Canales
Joaquín Saldaña as Joaquín Montencinos
Alejandro Trejo
Francesca Poloni as Natalia Salinas

References 

Chilean telenovelas
Spanish-language telenovelas
Chilevisión telenovelas
2015 Chilean television series debuts
2016 Chilean television series endings